Lukas Schubert (born 25 June 1989) is an Austrian footballer who currently plays for Napa Valley 1839 FC in the National Premier Soccer League. His career was interrupted in 2013 after suffering from a heart problem. After 21 months out he resumed playing football in July 2015.

References

External links
 
bundesliga.at

 Lukas Schubert Interview
 Austria export Lukas Schubert is facing a move to the USA 

Austrian footballers
Austrian Football Bundesliga players
SV Grödig players
Derry City F.C. players
League of Ireland players
1989 births
Living people
Association football midfielders